Standard Adding Machine Company was founded in the early 1890s (first records are from 1892) in Illinois and was the first company to (successfully) release a 10-key adding machine. The machine was a breakthrough for its time because it dramatically modernized computing. Earlier key driven adding machines, like the comptometer, featured  eight or more columns of nine keys, which made them cumbersome and costly and their operators prone to mistakes.  The 10 keys were set on a single row.

The invention won an international grand prize during the 1904 World's Fair and was heralded as a "modern life preserver" in an office journal.

History
William H. Hopkins, the inventor of the Standard Adding Machine, was a minister. When he moved to St. Louis in 1885 he served as chaplain and then pastor of St. Louis Second Christian Church. He continued to invent during those years and to find better ways to make an adding machine. In the 1890s, he left Second Christian Church and became assistant editor of the company that published The Christian Evangelist. William Hopkins filed his first patent on October 4, 1892. He registered the Hopkins Adding Machine Company in 1897, and in 1899 his company changed name to Standard Adding Machine Company (Illinois company was bought off).

The Standard Adding Machine Company released the first 10-key adding machine in about 1900. Hopkins' success led to competition. By 1915, other adding machine companies were vying for business. In 1916, Hopkins died, and his company began to decline.

Standard Adding Machine closed in 1921. In the decades since, the building housed businesses such as St. Louis Pump & Equipment Co., Lee Paper Co., and most recently, Harrison-Williams Store Fixtures. Vacant since 2003, the building was renovated in 2005 by Aquinas Institute of Theology.

Recognition
Because of the historical significance of the adding machine, the Standard Adding Machine building is listed on the National Register of Historic Places.

Notes

External links
 rechenmaschinen-illustrated.com Picture of an early Standard machine.
 
  Alt URL

Mechanical calculator companies
National Register of Historic Places in St. Louis
Industrial buildings and structures on the National Register of Historic Places in Missouri
Defunct manufacturing companies based in Missouri